Territorial Militia (Italian: Milizia territoriale) is a 1935 Italian comedy film directed by Mario Bonnard and starring Antonio Gandusio, Rosina Anselmi and Leda Gloria.

The film's sets were designed by the art director Virgilio Marchi.

Synopsis
A mild-mannered man, overpowered at home and the shoe factory where he is employed, is called up to military service during the First World War with the rank of Major. He enjoys the daring and comradeship of fighting, but at the end of the war returns home to resume his former downtrodden life. However, one day he snaps and begins to assert himself once more.

Cast
 Antonio Gandusio as Cav. Francesco Orlandi 
 Rosina Anselmi as Erminia - sua sorella 
 Leda Gloria as Martina 
 Maurizio D'Ancora as Guido Reani 
 Luigi Almirante as Salvatore Reani 
 Enrico Viarisio as Gasparri 
 Guido De Rege as Trimella 
 Gemma Bolognesi as Antonietta 
 Piero Pastore as Il soldato Grotta 
 Enzo Gainotti
 Loris Gizzi
 Mimo Billi

References

Bibliography 
 Roberto Chiti & Roberto Poppi. I film: Tutti i film italiani dal 1930 al 1944. Gremese Editore, 2005.

External links 
 

1935 films
Italian comedy films
Italian black-and-white films
1935 comedy films
1930s Italian-language films
Films directed by Mario Bonnard
World War I films set on the Italian Front
1930s Italian films